Body Talk may refer to:

Body Talk, play written by Stephen Daldry 1996
Body Talk, 1982 hardcore adult movie starring Angelique Pettyjohn
Body Talk, 1990 unsold game show pilot starring Vicki Lawrence
BodyTalk, LGBT+ Bar

Albums
Body Talk (George Benson album), 1973
Body Talk (Imagination album), 1981
Body Talk (The Wallets album), 1988
Body Talk Pt. 1, a 2010 mini-album by Robyn
Body Talk Pt. 2, a 2010 mini-album by Robyn
Body Talk Pt. 3, a 2010 mini-album by Robyn
Body Talk (Robyn album), a 2010 album by Robyn comprising 3-part Body Talk mini-albums

Places
 LGBT+ Bar, located in the centre of Utrecht, at the Oudegracht, famous for its party in the night of March 20th, 2011

Songs
"Body Talk" (The Deele song), 1983
"Body Talk" (Foxes song), 2015
"Body Talk" (Imagination song), 1981
"Body Talk" (Koo De Tah song), 1985
"Body Talk" (Majid Jordan song), 2017
"Body Talk" (Poison song), 1993
"Body Talk" (Ratt song), 1986
"Body Talk", song by John Otway
"Body Talk", song by Kix from their album Cool Kids
"Body Talk", song by Baccara from their 1979 album Colours
"Body Talk", song by The Knack from their 1991 album Serious Fun
"Bodytalk", song by twlv from his EP Contents ½
"Body Talks", a 2018 song by The Struts and Kesha

See also 
Body language